Wail 'N Soul 'M was a rocksteady record label created in 1966 by Bob Marley and the Wailers.

History 
In July 1967, Bunny Wailer was sentenced to 14 months in jail. The group then consisted of Bob Marley, Peter Tosh and Rita Marley.

In March 1968, Peter Tosh was arrested for protesting in the street. In October 1968, he participated in the Rodney riots.

In late 1968, West Indies Pressing Plant burned to the ground.

Discography

1966/67 Singles

Bend Down Low
Freedom Time
Nice Time
Hypocrite
Mellow Mood
Thank You Lord
Bus Dem Shut
Stir It Up
Lyrical Satirical I
This Train

1968 Singles

Funeral
Pound Get A Blow
Stepping Razor
I'm Hurting Inside 
Play Play Play
Mus' Get A Beatin' 
Fire Fire
Chances Are
The Lord Will Make A Way
Don't Rock My Boat

1969/1970 Singles

Tread-O
Trouble On The Road Again
Comma Comma
Rhythm
Feel Alright

References

Jamaican record labels